Heroes of the Wild is a 1927 American silent Western film serial produced by Nat Levine, directed by Harry S. Webb and released by Mascot Pictures. The film is considered to be lost.

Plot
A young woman is heir to a large fortune, but the key to finding it is on the leg markings of a horse called "The Ghost of the Gauchos". Unfortunately, the woman's uncle—her legal guardian—has his own plans for her fortune, and they don't include sharing it with her.

Cast
 Jack Hoxie as Jack Hale
 Josephine Hill as Selma Sanderson
 Joe Bonomo as John Kemp
 Tornado the Dog as Tornado
 White Fury the Horse as White Fury
 Linda Loredo as Carmen
 Jay J. Bryan as Winslow
 Emily Gerdes as Myra
 Helen Gibson as Julia

References

External links
 

1927 films
1927 Western (genre) films
1927 lost films
American silent serial films
American black-and-white films
Films directed by Harry S. Webb
Films produced by Nat Levine
Lost Western (genre) films
Lost American films
Mascot Pictures film serials
Silent American Western (genre) films
1920s American films